The Deseronto Bulldogs are a Senior "AAA" ice hockey team based out of Deseronto, Ontario.  They play in the Ontario Hockey Association's Eastern Ontario Senior Hockey League.

Notable players 
 Rick Rowley

Eastern Ontario Senior Hockey League teams